Daniel Vávra (born 2 September 1975) is a Czech video game writer, director, designer and co-founder of Warhorse Studios. He is best known as the lead writer of the video games Mafia (2002), Mafia II (2010) and Kingdom Come: Deliverance (2018).

Vávra started his career in 1998 at Illusion Softworks, initially working as a graphic artist for Hidden & Dangerous, he went on to become the lead writer of Mafia. After several projects in the mid-2000s, the studio was purchased by 2K Games in 2008 and renamed 2K Czech. The studio was working on Mafia II prior to the acquirement. Vávra greatly struggled with the restructured studio under 2K Games, and left in early 2009, prior to the game's release.

Following his departure, Vávra co-founded Warhorse Studios alongside Martin Klíma in 2011, which would eventually release Kingdom Come: Deliverance in 2018, a medieval role-playing game with Vávra as the lead writer. Warhorse Studios would be sold to Koch Media in 2019 for €33.2m, with Vávra remaining as its creative director.

Biography 
Daniel Vávra was born in Rychnov nad Kněžnou, before moving to Prague. He has partial Jewish ancestry. Since childhood, Vávra has enjoyed working with computers, drawing comics, and taking photos. He studied at the School of Applied Arts in Turnov and started his career as a graphic designer at advertising company TIPA. He has written numerous articles for the Czech gaming magazine Level and other gaming magazines, and is also a passionate player of paintball. He was also an active demoscener, under the pseudonym Hellboy, as part of the group Broncs.

Illusion Softworks
In 1998, Vávra joined Illusion Softworks as a 2D artist. His first project was Hidden and Dangerous, for which he created some textures. His next project was the highly acclaimed Mafia: The City of Lost Heaven, for which he was the lead designer, screenwriter and director. He later became the leading figure of Illusion Softworks's Prague subsidiary, and also worked on Wings of War, released in 2004. Around 2005, he worked on another project, a third-person shooter game Hi-Tech, but it was cancelled.

2K Games ownership and departure 
In 2008, it was announced that 2K Games had acquired Illusion Softworks, and had renamed the studio to 2K Czech. Vavra wrote, and the studio were working, on Mafia II prior to the ownership, and it would release in 2010. Whilst Vavra said nothing at the time, he would later claim he struggled greatly to work under the reformed studio, mainly citing the differences in the structuring systems of major studios compared to the former smaller structure that was used by Illusion Softworks. Vavra has since gone on to state his concerns that major publishers, and the way they are structured, mainly the collective decision making, causes great damage to the gaming industry. He had also presented a full script for a future Mafia III, which was rejected by the higher-ups.

Vavra departed the studio in 2009, with the rejection of his Mafia III script from higher-ups pushing him to leave, alongside mission cuts made to Mafia II. Following his departure, the ending of Mafia II was changed from what was on Vavra's original script. He has stated he does not know why this change was made, and that the change in the story does not make any sense to him. Several other original workers at the studio departed either during, or not long after, Mafia II's release.

Warhorse Studios
In 2011, Vávra co-founded Warhorse Studios, and wrote Kingdom Come: Deliverance, a role-playing video game that uses Cry Engine 3 set in a medieval-themed open world environment. The game was set to be delivered in 2015 through episodic iterations, and was successfully funded via Kickstarter. Repeatedly delayed, the game was eventually released in 2018, with more promised content released since then.

Political views 
He has been a vocal critic of censorship and what he believes is a progressive bias in video games journalism, in which he claims that it falsely accuses the gaming community of sexism. Vávra supported the GamerGate movement.

In 2012, Vávra led a protest against the arrest of Ivan Buchta and Martin Pezlar, Bohemia Interactive Arma 3 developers arrested during their holiday on the Greek island Lemnos. The protest was held outside the Greek embassy in Prague.

Video games
 Hidden & Dangerous (1999), Illusion Softworks
 Mafia: The City of Lost Heaven (2002), Illusion Softworks - writer and director, Czech voice talent casting
 Mafia II (2010), 2K Czech - game designer, writer, graphic designer
 Kingdom Come: Deliverance (2018), Warhorse Studios -  director, lead writer, voice director

Filmography

Film
 Medieval (2021) - Villager

Video games
 Kingdom Come: Deliverance (2018) - Sir Hanush of Leipa

References

External links 

1975 births
21st-century Czech businesspeople
Czech eurosceptics
Czech video game designers
Czech people of Jewish descent
Demosceners
Living people
People from Rychnov nad Kněžnou
Video game designers
Video game directors
Video game writers